Armand Vaquerin (21 February 1951 – 10 July 1993) was a French Rugby union footballer that represented France.

He played as a Loosehead prop for AS Béziers who won the French rugby championship ten times (a record), and for France. In 1993, Vaquerin shot himself while playing Russian roulette in a bar in Béziers.

Honours 
 Selected to represent France, 1971–1980
 French rugby champion, 1971, 1972, 1974, 1975, 1977, 1978, 1980, 1981, 1983, 1984 with AS Béziers
 Challenge Yves du Manoir 1975 and 1977 with AS Béziers

External links

 The top 10 frightening Frenchmen

1951 births
French rugby union players
France international rugby union players
Deaths by firearm in France
1993 deaths
Firearm accident victims
Accidental deaths in France
Rugby union props
Sportspeople from Aveyron
AS Béziers Hérault players